Tabatskuri Lake is an lake in the Borjomi Municipality and Akhalkalaki Municipality, Samtskhe–Javakheti region of Georgia.

Detail 

Tabatskuri Lake is located in the northern part of the Samsari Range, at 1991 m above sea level. Its surface area is 14.2 km2, while the catchment area is 83.1 km2. Its average depth is 15.5 m, maximal depth is 40.2 m. It gets its feed from snow, rainfall and underground waters.

It has a roughly rectangular shape, measuring 6 km long and 4.5 km wide. The annual range of fluctuation of the water level is as much as 1.1 m. Hydrographic network of the basin is poor.

The lake has a volcanic-tectonic origin. The lake is surrounded by the volcanic mountains. From December until March lake is frozen over. Coastline is partially indented. There are many bays and several islands.

The villages of Tabatskuri and Moliti lie around the lake. Tabatskuri is rich in fish, including trout, Common barbel, Eurasian carp and etc. Tabatskuri part of Ktsia-Tabatskuri Managed Reserve.

In 1745, the lake was described by Vakhushti Bagrationi in his work Description of the Kingdom of Georgia.

See also 
 List of lakes of Georgia

References 

Lakes of Georgia (country)
Geography of Samtskhe–Javakheti